The following is a list of products owned by the Coca-Cola Company, of which there are more than 500 in over 200 countries.

A

Abbey Well – bottled water available in the United Kingdom
Ades – drinking water available in Indonesia
Ades – soy-based drinks available in Latin America
AHA - carbonated water available in United States (AH!HA! in China) (OHHA in Hong Kong and Taiwan)
Alhambra – drinking water available in the United States
Ambasa – soft drink sold in Japan and Korea
American
Ameyal – fruit sodas available only in the cities of Cuernavaca and Toluca in Mexico
Amita – fruit juice available in Greece
Andina Calcio – fruit juice available in Chile
Angus Caldow
Andina Frut/Andifrut – fruit juice available in Chile
Andina Hi C – fruit juice available in Chile
Andina Nectar – fruit juice available in Chile
Apollinaris – German naturally sparkling mineral water
Appletiser – Sparkling apple drink
aquaBona – mineral water available in Portugal and Spain
Aquactive – sports drink formerly sold in Spain
Aquana – sports drink available in Belgium, Luxembourg, and Netherlands
Aquapure
Aquarius – sports drink
Aquarius Spring – bottled water available in the United States
Aqvaris
Aqua Shot – flavored water available in New Zealand
Arwa – mineral water sold across the Middle East
Avra (spring water) – bottled water available in Greece
Ayataka green tea
Aybal-Kin

aquasavana –  water available in Zambia

B

Bacardi Mixers – a co-branded product with the Bacardi rum manufacturer. Tropical drinks available in the United States, Australia, and Spain
Bambi - food manufacturing company in Serbia
Bankia – mineral water available in Bulgaria
Barq's – root beer
Barq's Floatz
Barq's Red Crème Soda
Beat – citrus-flavoured soft drink available in Mexico
Belté
Beverly – Non-alcoholic bitter apéritif available in Italy
Bibo – fruit punch available in Turkey, South Africa, Mozambique, and Canada
Big Crush
Big Tai
Bimbo
Bimbo Break
Bird's Nest
Bistra – bottled water in Croatia
Bistrone – Corn soup available in Japan
Bjäre – Coca-Cola's own julmust, available in Sweden
Black Cherry Vanilla Coca-Cola
BlackFire
Blue Sky
Bodyarmor SuperDrink
Boco
Bom Bit Maesil
BonAqua BonActive – grapefruit-flavored sports drink formerly available in Hong Kong and Macau, now replaced by Aquarius.
Bonaqua/BonAqua/Bonaqa – bottled water, carbonated and noncarbonated, fruit-flavoured or unflavoured. Available in parts of Europe, Asia, Africa, and South America. Called "aquaBona" in Portugal and Spain.
BotaniQ – fruit-flavoured water available in Ukraine
BPM Energy – Energy drink available in Ireland
Brazzi – brand of juice drinks, sold in Iceland
Bright And Early
Burn – Energy drink available in Latin America, Europe and South Korea Known as "Buzz" in Japan

C

Cafe Zu – Canned coffee with ginseng available in Thailand
Caffeine Free Barq's
Caffeine Free Coca-Cola – a caffeine free Coke. was included in 1983
Capri Sun
Caffeine Free New Coke – the ill-fated caffeine-free Coke
Caffeine Free Diet Coke/Coca-Cola light – diet Coke with no caffeine
Cal King – Yogurt drink available in Japan
Calypso
Canning's – fruit-flavoured soft drink available in Trinidad & Tobago. Rebadged version of Fanta.
Cappy – juice drink available in some parts of Europe and the Palestinian Territories
Caprice
Carioca
Carver's
Cascal
Cepita del valle – juice drink available in Argentina
Chaho
Charrua
Chaudfontaine – Mineral water from a spring in Belgium. It's available in Belgium and the Netherlands
Chaywa – coffee sold at gas stations by means of vending machines across South Africa
Cheers – fruit-flavoured soft drink available in Philippines
Cherry Coke – cherry-flavored Coca-Cola
Chinotto – lemon-lime-flavored soft drink available in Venezuela. see Sprite.
Chinotto light
Chippewa
Chivalry – fruit soda available in China
Ciel – Purified, noncarbonated bottled water available in Angola, Mexico, and Morocco
Ciel+ – flavored water available in Mexico
Citra – later Fanta Citrus. Grapefruit-flavored soft drink
Club
Coca-Cola – Namesake Coca-Cola product
Coca-Cola BlāK – Coca-Cola with coffee flavor added, now available as Coca-Cola Plus Coffee No Sugar
Coca-Cola Black Cherry Vanilla – Replaced with Coca-Cola Vanilla in 2007
Coca-Cola C2 – discontinued lo-carb and low sugar version
Coca-Cola California Raspberry – Released 2018, a naturally flavored variant of Coca-Cola sweetened with cane sugar.
Coca-Cola Citra – a citrus cola, available only in Japan
Coca-Cola Clear – a clear cola, available in Japan
Coca-Cola Energy Energy Drink, available in the United Kingdom and much of Europe.
Coca-Cola Georgia Peach – Released 2018, a naturally flavored variant of Coca-Cola sweetened with cane sugar.
Coca-Cola Life – a cola with less sugar and sweetened with cane sugar and stevia
Coca-Cola Light (see Diet Coke)
Coca-Cola with Lemon 2005 Limited edition, available only in some places in Europe along with its Zero counterpart
Coca-Cola with Lime – lime-flavored Coke
Coca-Cola Move – 2023 limited edition
Coca-Cola with No Calories and with Sweeteners from the Plant Stevia – a cola with no calories and sweetened with stevia extracts. Currently available in Greece
Coca-Cola Raspberry – a test marketed raspberry-flavored Coke. Only in Finland and New Zealand 
Coca-Cola Stevia No Sugar – a test product as a replacement for Coca-Cola Life. Launched only in New Zealand in 2018.
Coca-Cola Orange – 2007 limited edition, available only in the UK
Coca-Cola Orange Vanilla – Released 2019 - the zero sugar version was also released.
Coca-Cola Starlight – 2022 limited edition, available in North America.
Coca-Cola Stevia – Released 2019, available only in Canada, test product as a potential replacement for the current Coca-Cola Life.
Coca-Cola Zero Sugar – diet version of Coca-Cola, sister product of Diet Coke
Cocoteen
Coke II – Re-formulated Coca-Cola, replaced original formula Coca-Cola as "New Coke" for a brief time in 1985. Re-branded Coke II in 1992. Discontinued ca. 2002.
Colette Cola – discontinued, was only available in the German Democratic Republic
Costa Coffee – British coffee chain and is served worldwide.
Cresta
Cristal – mineral water
Crush – United States, Canada, Syria and Latin America
Coca-Cola: "The Artist MARSHMELLO'S LIMITED EDITION" a zero calorie watermelon and strawberry flavored coca cola sold in 2022
Cumberland Gap
Crystal

D

Daft Cola – The same as Mexican Coke, but put in limited edition Daft Punk bottles and sold exclusively in French clubs
Daizu no Susume – grapefruit-flavored soy soft drink available in Japan
DANNON and Danone (under license)
Dasani – Bottled water
Dasani Active
Dasani Balance
Dasani Flavors – flavored and lightly sweetened water
Dasani Nutriwater
Dasani Plus – Vitamin-enhanced flavored water
Dasani Sensations
Deep River Rock – bottled water available in Ireland
Delaware Punch – fruit-flavored, non-carbonated soft drink, discontinued due to/in response to the COVID-19 pandemic
Del Valle – Mexican nectars and juices, acquired by The Coca-Cola Company and bottler Coca-Cola FEMSA in 2007
DESCA
Diet A&W (Under license)
Diet Andina Frut/Andina Frut light
Diet Andina Nectar/Andina Nectar light
Diet Barq's
Diet Cherry Coke – diet version of Cherry Coke
Diet Coke/Coke Light – Low-calorie version of Coca-Cola (formerly known as Diet Coca-Cola or Coca-Cola Light), sister product of Coca-Cola Zero
Diet Coke Black Cherry Vanilla – the ill-fated black cherry vanilla diet Coke
Diet Coke Citra/Coca-Cola light Citra – Coca-Cola light (diet Coke) with lemon-lime flavor
Diet Coke Plus – Diet Coke fortified with vitamins
Diet Coke Sweetened with Splenda – diet Coke with splenda instead of aspartame
Diet Coke with Lemon/Coca-Cola light with Lemon – a lemon-flavored diet Coke
Diet Coke with Lime/Coca-Cola light with Lime – a lime-flavored diet Coke
Diet Coke with Raspberry
Diet Crush – diet version of Crush
Diet Dr. Pepper
Diet Fanta/Fanta light/Fanta Zero/Fanta Free – diet versions of Fanta
Diet Freskyta – diet version of Freskyta
Diet Inca Kola – diet version of Inca Kola
Diet Kia Ora – diet version of Kia Ora
Diet Krest – diet version of Krest
Diet Lift/Lift light – diet version of Lift
Diet Lilt/Lilt Zero – diet versions of Lilt
Diet Master Pour – diet version of Master Pour
Diet Mello Yello – diet version of Mello Yello
Diet Nestea/Nestea light/Nestea Sin Azúcar – diet versions of Nestea
Diet Northern Neck Ginger Ale/Northern Neck Diet Ginger Ale - diet version of ginger ale, discontinued due to/in response to the COVID-19 pandemic
Diet Oasis – diet version of Oasis
Diet Quatro/Quatro light – diet version of Quatro
Diet Sarsi – Root beer-flavored soft drink
Diet Schweppes (Under license)
Diet Seagrams – diet version of Seagrams
Diet Sport
Diet Sprite/Sprite light – diet version of Sprite
Diet Squirt – diet version of Squirt
Diet Tai/Tai light – diet version of Tai
Diet Vanilla Coke – diet version of Vanilla Coke
Diva
Dobriy
Doğazen – drinking spring water in Turkey
Dorna – Sparkling mineral water available in Romania and Moldova
Dr. Pepper- Only in Europe & S. Korea (Dr. Pepper is an independently owned company elsewhere) 
Dr. Pepper Zero Sugar - Only in Europe (Dr. Pepper is A Pepsi Products owned By PepsiCo) 
Drim
Dunkin' Donuts – Released 2017, ready-to-drink iced coffee beverages available in Original, French Vanilla, Mocha, Espresso, Cookies & Cream and Pumpkin Spice flavors.
Dunkin' Donuts Shot In The Dark – Released 2018, ready-to-drink iced espresso beverages available in Mocha, Vanilla and Caramel flavors.

E

Earth & Sky – Available in the Philippines
Eight O'Clock – non-carbonated powdered juice drink available in the Philippines
Eight O'Clock Funchum
El Rayek
Elephant Available in Sri Lanka
Escuis
Escuis light
Eva Water
Enviga – fruit-flavored green tea available in Austria, Belgium Czech Republic, Hungary, Netherlands, Slovakia, Spain, and the United States
Emotion – Available in many countries

F

Fairlife – United States
Fanta – several fruit-flavored soft drinks (different for each region)
Fanta J-Lemon – Available in Thailand
Fanta J-Melon – Available in Thailand
Fanta Lactic – Milk drink available in Hong Kong, Macau, Taiwan, and the United States
Fanta Shokata
Far Coast – coffee and tea brand in Canada
Fernandes – several tropical fruit-flavored soft drinks only available in Suriname, the Netherlands, and the Caribbean Netherlands
Finley
Fioravanti – fruit-flavored soft drink available in Ecuador (1878) and Spain (2006)
Five Alive – Five-fruit juice blends available in Kenya, Nigeria, Tanzania, Uganda, and the United Kingdom
Five Alive (US) – Blend of five citrus juices available in Canada and the United States
Fizz – A carbonated tamarind drink produced in Lebanon.
Flavor Rage
Floatz
Fontana
Fraser & Neave
Freezits
Fresca – flavored caffeine-free, calorie-free soft drink
Fresca 1 – grapefruit-flavored soft drink available in Costa Rica, Mexico, and Panama
Frescolita
Freskyta
Fresquinha
Fress – First introduced in Japan 2004
Frestea (under license)
Fria – fruit-flavored soft drinks bottled in Curaçao
Frisco – fruit-flavored carbonated soft drink available in Finland and Lithuania
Frucci
Frugos
Frugos Fresh
Fruita – (South Australia)
Fruitia
Fruitlabo
Fruitopia – non-carbonated soft drinks
Fruitopia Freeze
Fruitopia Tea
Fruktime
Frutina
Frutonic – Lightly carbonated soft drink available in Belgium, Luxembourg, and New Zealand
Full Throttle – Citrus-flavored energy drink available in the United States and Canada
Full Throttle Blue Demon – Agave Lime Tangerine energy drink available in the United States
Full Throttle Sugar Free
Full Throttle Coffee
Fuze Beverage – vitamin infused juice and tea drinks available in the United States and Ecuador
Fuzetea

G

Genki No Moto
Georgia – coffee drink available in Bahrain, India, Japan, South Korea, Qatar, Oman, Saudi Arabia, and the United Arab Emirates It is also available in the United States exclusively through Japanese Supermarkets.
Georgia Cafe au Lait
Georgia Club – coffee beverage available in Singapore, Japan, and India
Georgia Gold
Gini
Glacéau – vitamin water sold in the United States, Britain, and France
Glacéau Fruitwater – Sold in USA
glacéau smartwater – Sold in USA
Glacéau Vitaminenergy – Sold in USA
Glacéau Vitaminwater – Sold in USA
Glacéau Vitaminwater zero – Sold in USA
Gladiator – an energy drink available in Mexico and Brazil
Godiva Belgian Blends – Co-branded coffee/chocolate drink with Godiva, available in the United States
Gold Peak Tea – iced tea drink, lemon-flavored, green, diet, unflavored, and diet unflavored, available in the United States
Gold Spot
Golden Crush
Goulburn Valley
Grapette
Groovy
Guaraná Jesus
Guaraná Kuat light
Guaraná Kuat Zero

H

Hajime – Green tea available in Japan
H2OK
Hansen's
Happy Valley
Haru no Mint Shukan
Haru Green Tea – tea drink available in South Korea
Hawai – Tropical sparkling soda that originated in Morocco (1991). It can now also be found in the Netherlands, Belgium, France, Spain and Tunisia.  (2020)
Healthworks
Hero
Hi-C – juice drink available in the United States and Philippines
Hi-C Tea – tea drinks available in Costa Rica, El Salvador, Hong Kong, Indonesia, Macau, Mariana Islands, Nicaragua, and Philippines
Hires
Hi Spot
Hit – fruit-flavoured carbonated soft drink available in Venezuela See Fanta.
Honest Tea – Tea sold in USA
Hot Point
Horizon
Huang – tea available in Japan

I

Ice Dew – bottled water available in China
Ice mountain – bottled water available in Singapore
Ikon
Inca Kola – soft drink available in Peru, Bolivia, Ecuador, Chile, and Sweden It's also available in Spain, America and Canada through Latin American food stores.
Innocent Drinks – Took control in 2013
Ipsei
Iron Brew – South African soft drink
Izvorul Alb

J

Jaz Cola – cola specifically developed for consumers who live in the Visayan Islands in the Philippines
Jericho – mineral water from Jericho
Jet Tonic
Jinmeile
Jolly Juice
Joy
Joya – flavor sodas Available in some cities of Mexico
Jozuni Yasai
Jurassic Well
Just Juice
Juta

K

Kapo – Available in Chile and Brazil
Kapo Axion
Kapo Super Power
Keri
Kia-Ora
Kidsfruitz
Kilimanjaro (water)
Kin – bottled water available in Argentina. Known as Benedictino since 2021.
Kin Cider – a lemon-lime-flavored soft drink in South Korea
Kin Light
Kinley – This brand is used by two types of drinks:
 Bottled still water available in Bangladesh, Bulgaria, Pakistan, India, Sri Lanka, Maldives, and Nigeria
 A carbonated water with a wide array of variants: tonic, bitter lemon, club soda, and fruit-flavored. Available in Austria, Belgium, Bulgaria, Czech Republic, Denmark, El Salvador, Germany, Hungary, India, Israel, Italy, Lithuania, Luxembourg, Maldives, Moldova, Nepal, Netherlands, Norway, Poland, Romania, Slovakia, Sweden, Switzerland, United States, West Bank-Gaza, and Zambia
Kiwi Blue – bottled water available in New Zealand
KMX – a multidimensional energy drink available in Puerto Rico and the United States
Kochakaden – flavored tea available in Japan
Kofola
Kola Inglesa
Koumi Soukai
Krest
Kropla Beskidu – bottled water, available in Poland only
Kuat – Guarana soft drink available in Brazil and the United States
Kuat Light
Kuli
Kvass – Russia
Kyun
KisT – Sold in Panama. (Panama version of Fanta)

L

Leed
Lift – fruit juice soft drink. Available in: Albania, Australia, Belgium, Bulgaria, Colombia, Czech Republic, Fiji, Germany, Guatemala, Hungary, North Macedonia, Mexico, New Zealand, Philippines, Poland, Slovakia, United States, and Vanuatu
Lift plus
Lift Plus light
Lilia – Natural mineral water available in Italy
Lilt
Limca – Lemon-lime soft drink available in India, Nepal, Nigeria, Saudi Arabia, the United Arab Emirates, and Zambia
Limelite
Limonade
Linnuse
Lion
Love Body – Red oolong tea diet drink with dietary fiber available in Japan
Lemon & Paeroa (L&P) – Distributed in New Zealand and recently in Australia

M

Maaza – Mango juice drink with added calcium available in Pakistan, Bangladesh, India, Netherlands, and Maldives
Mad River
Magnolia
Magnolia Funch
Magnolia Zip
Malvern Water – bottled spring water available worldwide under the Schweppes brand
Manantial – bottled water available in Colombia
Manzana Lift
Manzana Mia
Mare Rosso – Non-alcoholic bitter soft drink available in Spain
Marocha Chaba no Ko – Unflavored green tea drink available in Japan
Master Chill
Master Pour
Matusov Pramen
Mazoe
Meijin
Mello
Mello Yello – Citrus soft-drink available in American Samoa, Canada, Guam, Japan, Mariana Islands, and the United States
Mello Yello Zero
Mer – juice drink available in Sweden
Mezzo Mix light orange-flavored Coke
Miami
Mickey's Adventures – Vitamin-enriched juice drink available in Austria, Belgium, Dominican Republic, France, Hong Kong, Mexico, Netherlands, Portugal, Slovakia, Spain, and Switzerland
Mickey & Friends – fruit juice available in Japan
Mickey Mouse
Migoro-Nomigoro
Minaqua
Minute Maid – brand of juice drinks, with a sub-brand of fruit-flavored soda which contains some fruit juice
Minute Maid Active – orange juice drink enriched with Glucosamine HCI available in the United States
Minute Maid AntiOx – Combination of fruit juices with antioxidizing properties available in Spain
Minute Maid Clásicos – Unsweetened fruit juices available in Spain
Minute Maid Coolers – fruit beverages available in the United States
Minute Maid Deli
Minute Maid Duofrutas – Mix of fruit juice, skimmed milk, and vitamins available in Spain
Minute Maid Fresh
Minute Maid Fruit Plus – juice drink available in Japan
Minute Maid Heart Wise – orange juice drink naturally sourced with plant sterols available in the United States
Minute Maid Hi-C – Available in Costa Rica
Minute Maid Juice Box – 100% juice drink available in the United States
Minute Maid Juice To Go – juice drink marketed in plastic bottles to drink on the go available in the United States
Minute Maid Just 10 – fruit punch-flavored juice drink available in the United States
Minute Maid Lemonades and Fruit Drinks – fruit drink available in the United States
Minute Maid Light – Low calorie fruit drinks available in the United States
Minute Maid Limón&Nada – Lemonade drink available in Spain
Minute Maid Mais – Ready-to-drink juice drink available in Brazil
Minute Maid Multi-Vitamin – orange juice enriched with vitamins and minerals available in the United States
Minute Maid Nutri+ – flavored milk drink available in Mexico and Vietnam
Minute Maid Premium – 100% fruit juices available in Spain
Minute Maid Premium Lemonades and Punches – juice drinks available in the United States
Minute Maid Premium Orange Juice and Premium Blends (Frozen & Refrigerated) – fruit drinks available in the United States
Minute Maid Pulpy Orange – Drink with orange pulp and flavors available in India
Minute Maid Selección – fruit juices and nectars available in Spain
Minute Maid SojaPlus – Drink with fruit juice and soy available in Spain
Minute Maid Soft Drink
Minute Maid Splash
Mireille
Mone
Monsoon
Montefiore
Mori No Mizudayori – bottled water available in Japan
Morning Deli – fruit drink available in Japan
Mother (100% Natural Energy) – Canned energy drink available in Australia since late 2006
Mount Franklin – bottled water available in Australia
Mountain Creed
Mountain Creed Zero Sugar
Moxie – regional Maine soda
Moya semya
Mr Pibb
Multiva – bottled water available in Poland
Multivita

N

N-Juice
Nada
Nagomi
Nalu – mango-flavored, low in calories soft drink available in Belgium, Luxembourg, and Netherlands
Namthip – bottled water available in Thailand
Nanairo Acha
Nativa – yerba mate-flavored, briefly available in Argentina
Naturaqua
Nature's Own – flavored mineral water available in Papuva Nueva Guinea
Nectar Andina
Nectarin
Nestea – flavored tea drink
Nevada – bottled water available in Venezuela
Neverfail – bottled water available in Australia
New Coke
NeXstep
Next
Nico's Brassness
Nordic Mist – Line of adult mixers soft drink available in Chile, Finland, Portugal, and Spain
Northern Neck - ginger ale discontinued due to/in response to the COVID-19 pandemic
NOS (drink)
Nutri Boost
Nusta

O

Oasis – Non-carbonated juice drink available in Belgium, United Kingdom, Ireland, Malta, France, and the Netherlands
Odwalla – juice drinks and natural health beverages available in the United States and Canada
OOHA
Old Colony
Olimpija
OK Soda

P

Paani
Pacific Orchard
Pampa
Pams
peace tea
Pearona
Peats Ridge Springs
Pepe Rico
Pibb Xtra – soft drink (is a Coca-Cola product in the US)
Pibb Xtra Zero – no-calorie soft drink
Piko
Pilskalna
Planet Java
Play
Pocarrot
Pocket Dr.
Poiana Negri – Sparkling water available in Romania
Poms – sour apple-flavored soft drink available in the Magreb region of North Africa
Ponkana – juice drink available in Philippines
Pop Cola – Available in the Philippines
Portello
Powerade – sports drink
Powerade alive
Powerade light
Powerade Option
Powerade Zero
Powerplay
Pulp Ananas
Pump – bottled water available in Australia, South Africa, New Zealand, and Fiji

Q

Qoo – non-carbonated drink available in Japan 
Quatro – grapefruit and lemon-flavoured soft drink available in Argentina, Chile, Colombia, and Uruguay
Quwat Jabal – citrus-flavoured soft drink available in the Middle East

R

Ramblin' Root Beer
Rani juice – a fruit-based juice available in the Middle East.
Raspberry Coke
Ready to Brew
Real – mineral sparkling water in Moldova
Real Gold – Energy drink available in Japan
Red Flash
Red Lion
Refresh Tea
Relentless
Rich
Richy
Rim Zim – cumin seed-flavoured soft drink available in Bangladesh and India
Rio Gold
Ripe N Ready
Risco
Riwa
Robinson Brothers
Römerquelle – Austrian mineral water
Rosa – still and sparkling mineral water available in Serbia
Rosalta
Roses
Royal Club Shandy
Royal Tru – an orange-flavored soft drink available in the Philippines
Royal Tru light – light version of Royal Tru Orange

S

Safia
Samantha
Samurai – an energy drink available in Vietnam and Philippines
San Luis – bottled water available in Peru
San Sao
Santiba – Soda and ginger ale available in the United States in the 1970s
Santolin
Sarsi – root beer brand available in the Philippines
Saryusaisai – tea drink available in Japan
SchiBe Balls – a bubbly brown drink
Schweppes (Under license)
Scorpion – energy drink available in Japan and India
Seagram's – Ginger ale, club soda, seltzer, and tonic water available in Mexico, Norway, Sweden, Trinidad & Tobago, U.S. Virgin Islands and the United States
Seasons
Seltz
Sensation
Sensun
Senzao – guaraná-flavoured carbonated soft drink available in Mexico
Shichifukuzen
Shizen Plus – Green tea blended with complementary natural herb extracts. Available in Thailand
Shock
Signature
Sim
Simba
Simply Apple
Simply Lemonade
Simply Limeade
Simply Orange – Pasteurized orange juice available in the United States
Sintonia
Sky Cola 
Slap
Smart – Carbonated soft drink available in China and the United States
Smart Water
Sobo
Sodafruit Caprice Oranges
Sokenbicha – Blended tea drink available in Japan and the United States
Solo
Sonfil
Soonsoo 100
Southern Sun
Sparkle
Sparkling Yogurt – Carbonated yogurt manufactured by Global Beverage Ent. Inc.
Sparletta – a range of sodas, including cream soda and Iron Brew
Splash – a clear soft drink available since 1995 in the autonomous community of Andalusia, Spain
Splice – a lemon-lime soda
Sport Cola
Sport Plus
Spring! by Dannon – bottled spring water available in the United States
Spring! by Dannon Fluoride to Go – Fluoridated spring water available in the United States
Sprite – lemon-lime-flavored soft drink
Sprite 3G
Sprite Cranberry
Sprite Ice
Sprite Remix
Sprite Light
Sprite Zero
Spur
Squirt – Grapefruit-flavoured soda (not originally a Coca-Cola product – now owned by Keurig Dr Pepper)
Stoney Ginger Beer
Sugar Free Full Throttle
Sun Valley
Sunfill – juice drink available in parts of Asia, Africa, Europe, and the United States
Sunfilled & Fruit Tree
Supa
Superkools
Supper Cola – brand of soft drinks and juices in Pakistan
Surge – Citrus soda, discontinued 2003, re-released in 2014 as an Amazon exclusive and later in 2015 in fountains at Burger King restaurants. Retail re-release in 2018 in 16oz cans.
Svali – brand of juice drinks, sold in Iceland
Sweecha
Swerve – Sweetened milk formerly available in three flavors – a vanilla-banana flavour called Vanana, a blueberry-strawberry flavour called Blooo, and a chocolate flavour

T

Tab – Coke's original diet soda, sweetened with saccharin, discontinued in 2020, due to/in response to the COVID-19 pandemic
Tab Energy
Tab x-tra
TADAS
Tahitian Treat
Tai
Tanora
Tarumi
Tavern
Tepelene - still and sparkling mineral water available in Albania and Kosovo
The Tea for Dining
Tea World Collection
The Kearnels Homebrew – tea beverage available in Taiwan
The Spirit of Georgia – competitive product to Bionade available in Germany
The Wellness
Thextons
This Water – Coca-Cola is a 58% shareholder in parent company Innocent Drinks
Thums Up – Carbonated soft drink in India and Bangladesh
Thunder – Fruit-flavored energy drink available in the Philippines, replacing Samurai.
Tian Tey – tea available in Belgium
Tian Yu Di/Heaven and Earth – tea drinks and bottled water available in Hong Kong, Mariana Islands, and Singapore
Tiky – Pineapple-flavored soft drink available in Guatemala
Top
Topo Chico – Sparkling water bottled in Mexico
Toppur – flavored and unflavoured sparkling water available in Iceland
Top's
Tropical – chain of flavors in El Salvador
Trópí – brand of juice drinks, sold in Iceland (similar to Minute Maid)
Tuborg Squash – orange soda in Denmark
Turkuaz – drinking water in Turkey
Twist

U

Ultra Energy – energy drink, available in Serbia
Urge - energy drink originating in Norway, available in Scandinavia
Urun

V

Valle – orange Juice sold in South America
Valpre – bottled water available in South Africa
Valser – flavored and unflavoured bottled water available in Germany, Russia, and Switzerland
Vanilla Coke
Vault – hybrid energy citrus soda (discontinued)
Vault Zero (discontinued)
VegitaBeta
Vica
Victoria – fruit sodas available only in the state of Querétaro in Mexico
Vita – orange-flavored juice drink available in Zambia
Vital – bottled water available in Chile
ViO
Vital O
Vitamin Water
Vitingo
Viva/Viva! – mineral water available in the Philippines
Vlasinska Rosa – water packaged in Serbian Vlasina factory (purchased by Coca-Cola HBC in 2005), best selling non sparkling water in the region

W

Water Salad
Wilkins – distilled drinking water available in the Philippines
Wink
Winnie the Pooh Junior Juice

Y

Yang Guang – tea varieties (China)
Yang Guang Juicy T
Yoli – lemon-lime soda (only in Acapulco, Guerrero, Mexico)
Youki
Yumi

References

External links
CocaCola.com Brands Coca-Cola website

 
Coca-Cola
Coca-Cola brands
Coca-Cola brands
Coca-Cola